Peter Peschel (born 26 January 1972) is a German former professional football who played mainly as a midfielder. He was with his family resettled as Aussiedler from Poland  to West Germany at the age of five. Peschel was married to a gymnast Magdalena Brzeska, with whom he had two children.

Career statistics

Club

References

External links 
 

1972 births
Living people
People from Prudnik
German people of Polish descent
German footballers
Association football midfielders
Bundesliga players
2. Bundesliga players
VfL Bochum players
MSV Duisburg players
SSV Jahn Regensburg players
Tennis Borussia Berlin players